Cheongju International Airport  is an international airport in Cheongwon-gu, Cheongju, South Korea. It also serves the cities of Daejeon and Sejong. In 2018, 2,453,649 passengers used the airport. It also houses the 17th fighter wing of the ROKAF. There is a railway station next to the airport, called Cheongju Airport station, which is on the Chungbuk Line.

Overview 
Cheongju International Airport is located at Ipsang-ri (a township), Naesu-eup (읍; town), Cheongwon-gu, Cheongju, Chungcheongbuk-do. A railway station is located nearby. It opened as a military airbase in September 1978, and in 1984, international airport construction began. The construction was completed in December 1996, and it was opened as Cheongju International Airport on April 28, 1997. During the mid 80's, Cheongju was selected as a possible site for Korea's main international airport before Incheon became the preferred location. It can process 1.23 million people from domestic flights and 1.15 million people from international flights annually, and the parking lots can hold 770 vehicles. In addition, airplanes can operate 196,000 times a year. There used to be flights to Busan and Saipan, but they were stopped due to low ridership. Currently, there are domestic flights to Jeju and international flights to China, Japan, Taiwan, and Thailand. Because Cheongju Airport is sharing with military, taking photograph or video of apron, runway and military facility is strictly prohibited.

Parking Facilities 
It has a facility for parking 1,100 vehicles directly opposite to the passenger terminal. The facility is open between 6:30 and 22:00.

Airlines and destinations

Passenger

Cargo

Statistics

Ground transportation

Railway
There is a train station at Cheongju Airport but it is not on a main rail line, and the schedule is limited. KTX high speed train does not stop at Cheongju city but stops outside Cheongju at Osong Station.
Train runs from Cheongju Airport to Osong takes 18 minutes, but it only runs every one to two hours (depending on time of day). From Osong to Seoul there is a frequent KTX train that takes slightly less than 1 hour. The total journey time on train from Cheongju Airport to Seoul is generally 1 hour 30 minutes, depending on the connecting time at Osong Station.

Bus
In 2019, there are 13 express and conventional buses per day from Seoul's Central City Terminal and four buses from the COEX City Airport Terminal in southern Seoul. The buses takes 1 hour 20 minutes to 2 hours to get to Cheongju Airport.

See also 

 Transportation in South Korea

References

External links 
 Cheongju Airport Official page

Airports established in 1997
Airports in South Korea
Cheongju
Buildings and structures in North Chungcheong Province
1997 establishments in South Korea
20th-century architecture in South Korea